Corey James Rodney Panter (born 19 October 2000) is an English professional footballer who plays as a defender for National League side Eastleigh. He came through Luton Town's academy, and during his development there went on loan to Hendon, Biggleswade Town (twice), Dundee and Kidderminster Harriers.

Career
A product of Luton Town's academy, Panter was loaned out to Hendon and Biggleswade Town during the 2019–20 season. However, the 2019–20 Southern Football League season was abandoned and results expunged because of the COVID-19 pandemic in the United Kingdom.

Panter signed a new development contract with Luton on 19 June 2021 and joined Dundee, who were newly promoted to the Scottish Premiership, for pre-season training with a view to a loan move. He signed for Dundee on a season-long loan on 11 July. Panter scored his first goal for the club on his debut, a 5–2 win in the Scottish League Cup against Forfar Athletic. Panter also played for Dundee B in the Scottish Challenge Cup, where he was credited with another goal against Peterhead. On Boxing Day in 2021, Panter made his first league appearance for Dundee away to Aberdeen.

On 2 January 2022, Panter was recalled by Luton. On 21 April, Panter joined National League North side Kidderminster Harriers on loan until the end of the season. Panter made his debut for the Harriers in a league game against Leamington.

On 22 July, after a successful trial period, Panter signed with National League side Eastleigh.

Career statistics

References

2000 births
Living people
English footballers
Association football defenders
Luton Town F.C. players
Hendon F.C. players
Biggleswade Town F.C. players
Dundee F.C. players
Scottish Professional Football League players
Place of birth missing (living people)

Eastleigh F.C. players
National League (English football) players